Gerard McGlynn is a retired American soccer midfielder who played professionally in the Western Soccer Alliance and Major Indoor Soccer League.  He is currently the Vice President of Crossfire Premier Soccer Club.

McGlynn graduated from O'Dea High School in 1981.  He then attended Seattle Pacific University where he played on the men's soccer team from 1981 to 1984.  He was a member of the SPU team which won the 1983 NCAA Men's Division II Soccer Championship and finished runner-up in 1984.  In 1984, he began playing for F.C. Seattle and would play each summer outdoor season with the team until 1987.  He played for the Tacoma Stars of the Major Indoor Soccer League from 1985 to 1986 and the Louisville Thunder of the American Indoor Soccer Association from 1986 to 1987.

References

External links

 MISL stats

1962 births
Living people
Soccer players from Seattle
American soccer players
American Indoor Soccer Association players
Seattle Storm (soccer) players
Louisville Thunder players
Major Indoor Soccer League (1978–1992) players
Seattle Pacific Falcons men's soccer players
Tacoma Stars players
Western Soccer Alliance players
Association football forwards
Association football midfielders